Romāns Vainšteins (born 3 March 1973, in Talsi) is a former professional road bicycle racer from Latvia. He won the road race at the 2000 World Cycling Championship in Plouay, France. At the end of the  race, he won the sprint for the line ahead of Zbigniew Spruch and defending champion Óscar Freire.

Following his world title, Vainšteins moved to the  team under Patrick Lefevere. Even with some impressive results, such as third place in the 2001 Paris–Roubaix, he was unable to follow up on the success of his world championship.

Major results

1996
 3rd Memorial Van Coningsloo
1998
 1st GP Industria & Artigianato di Larciano
 1st Grand Prix Aarhus
 3rd Road race, National Road Championships
1999
 1st  Road race, National Road Championships
 1st Overall Settimana internazionale di Coppi e Bartali
 1st Paris–Brussels
 1st Grand Prix of Aargau Canton
 1st Stage 6 Giro d'Italia
 Tirreno–Adriatico
1st Stages 1 & 6
 1st Gran Premio di Chiasso
 2nd Giro del Lago Maggiore
 3rd HEW Cyclassics
 3rd Coppa Bernocchi
 4th Trofeo Melinda
 5th Gent–Wevelgem
2000
 1st  Road race, UCI Road World Championships
 1st Coppa Bernocchi
 2nd Overall Rheinland-Pfalz Rundfahrt
1st Stages 1 & 2
 2nd Overall Three Days of De Panne
 2nd Gran Premio Bruno Beghelli
 3rd Tour of Flanders
 3rd Clásica de San Sebastián
 3rd Classic Haribo
 4th Amstel Gold Race
 4th Kuurne–Brussels–Kuurne
 5th Omloop Het Volk
 5th Grand Prix of Aargau Canton
 6th Overall Ronde van Nederland
 9th Milan–San Remo
 10th Overall Tirreno–Adriatico
1st Stage 8
 10th HEW Cyclassics
 10th Züri–Metzgete
2001
 1st Stage 3 Volta a Catalunya
 1st Stage 6 Tirreno–Adriatico
 2nd HEW Cyclassics
 3rd Overall UCI Road World Cup
 3rd Milan–San Remo
 3rd Paris–Roubaix
2002
 3rd Time trial, National Road Championships
 5th Paris–Tours
2003
 1st Stage 4 Giro Della Provincia Di Lucca
2004
 5th Grand Prix de Fourmies
 7th Milan–San Remo

Grand Tour results

Classics results timeline

References

External links
Official Website 

1973 births
Living people
People from Talsi
Latvian Jews
Latvian male cyclists
Olympic cyclists of Latvia
Jewish sportspeople
UCI Road World Champions (elite men)
Cyclists at the 1996 Summer Olympics
Cyclists at the 2004 Summer Olympics
Latvian Giro d'Italia stage winners